Igor Vulokh (January 3, 1938 – November 28, 2012) was a Russian nonconformist artist of the 1960s, a leading exponent of abstraction in Russian art.

Biography 

Igor Vulokh was born in Kazan on January 3, 1938. His childhood and early youth spanned the war and post-war years. His father Alexander went off to war, and his mother Lidia was left alone. His father died in 1942 and his mother became hospitalized from hunger and exhaustion. Vulokh  was not aware that his mother was in hospital and he ended up in a children's home. After the war Lidia searched for Igor and finally found him.

From his early youth, Vulokh had a penchant for art. His first sketches, very bright and clear, astonished the teachers of Kazan Art School, where he studied painting from 1953 to 1958. As a student, Vulokh was greatly influenced by his teacher Victor Podursky (professor at the Shanghai Art Academy and a connoisseur of Japanese and Chinese art). His landscape Winter displayed at the All-Soviet Art Exhibition of 1957 at the Moscow Manege, brought him his first recognition: two positives reviews by the classic Soviet sculptor Konenkov and Yuon appeared in international newspaper.

Vulokh applied to the Surikov Institute in Moscow but is not admitted. Thanks to the protection of the well-known painter Georgy Nissky, Vulokh enter the Art Department the All-Soviet State Institute of Cinematography (VGIK). The VGIK residence hall is a singular site for encounters. There, Igor Vulokh's roommate was Naum Kleiman, then a student at the Department of Cinematography and now the director of the Museum of Cinema. The writer Vasily Shukshin also became a good friend.

At the Pushkin Museum of Fine Arts, Vulokhh meet the young artist Anatoly Zverev. His drawings caught Vulokhh's attention thanks to their unusual and vivid style. A passion for painting brought the notice artists together, and they become good friends. That same year, Vulokh married Kira Viktorova.

The VI International Youth Festival in 1957 in Sokolnoki Park U.S. and French Pavilions and personal retrospective of Pablo Picasso. For Vulokhh, studies at VGIK, where students had the unique opportunity to see rare films that were often inaccessible to the public at large, were interesting but also quite burdensome. He had no need for most subjects connected with Soviet dogma, or those having to do with filmmaking. In 1960, he quit the Institute of Cinematography and began to engage in the creative process freely.

The friends of these years 

The year 1961 was a landmark in Vulokh's career. He met the poet Gennady Aigi, the “friend of these year” at the house of Naum Kleiman, who was working at the State Film Foundation in Belye Stolby. Subsequently, they formed a poet-artist duo: Igor made a series of sketchers based on Aigi's remarkably traditional yet innovative poetry. Aigi dedicated a cycle of poems to Vulokh.

There was something in the field too:
That lived like Jesus in a person:
This had been taken out long ago!

As “twin field”  Vulokh and Aigi understood each other right away. Common intellectual pursuits, artistic tastes, and spiritual kinship drew close together. Later on, both worked as editors of the catalog Mayakovsky Artist published in 1961. Gennady Aigi was closely familiar with the first avant-garde movement and was a great connoisseur of poetry, studying forbidden as well as forgotten works of literature. He worked at the Mayakovsky Museum, whose visitors included Nikolai Khardzhiev and Aleksei Kruchenykh, who organized exhibitions of avant-garde artist of the twenties – Tatlin, Malevich, Larionov, Goncharova, Filiniv, etc. (Vulokh was especially close with Khardzhiev and greatly influenced by him) / These were major events, and they that resonated throughout Europe. Among the rare foreigners living in Moscow who took an interest in the Russia avant-garde art of the time was the Danish art historian Troels Andersen (former director of Museum Jorn in Silkeborg, Denmark). A connoisseur and lover of the Russian avant-garde, Andersen subsequently wrote a four-volume work on Kazimir Malevich and organized a retrospective of his work in New York. Aigi acquainted Vulokh with a circle of people who were capable of understanding and appreciating his art. This was a unique exchange of knowledge, feeling, and artistic explorations – similar to the situation depicted in the film “Vocal Parallels”. A reserved person by nature, Vulokh found a friend and new hope in Aigi.

The poet and the artist published a dozen books done jointly in Russia and abroad. In 1989, the cycle of poetry “Veronika's Notebook” (translated by Peter France) was published in England. Dedicated to Aigi's newborn daughter Veronika, the book was illustrated by Igor Vulokh. Subsequently, a series of poems dedicated by Aigi to Vulokh were published as a separate book with the emblematic title “Friend of These Years” (1998), for which Vulokh also made a series of illustrations.

The year 1961 was also marked by Vulokh's first solo exhibition in Moscow at the Exhibition Room of Union of Artists. That year, Vulokh also joined the youth section of the Moscow Union of Artists.

Igor Vulokh learned of famous collector George Kostaki, whose apartment walls, according to eyewitnesses, were completely covered by works of Russian avant-garde artists of the Twenties. Vulokh and Kostaki's friendship began in 1968, and Vulokh still retains particular and warm memories of Kostakis remarkable collections.

Divinity school is the center of the universe 

In 1968, Vulokh begins to make white minimalist paintings. He will periodically return to the theme of “pure white” over his entire career. These subtle works in pastel hues make up his so-called “White Period”. At that time, his spiritual strivings and study of theological works brought Vulokh to the Divinity School at Trinity-Sergius Monastery. There he became an assistant in the Department of Western Religions. At the same time, Vulokh continued to work actively, experimenting with different areas of painting.

Opposites sometimes meet 

Vulokh was admitted to the Moscow Branch of the USSR Union of Artists in 1971. Membership in the Union of Artists allowed Vulokh to focus on his artistic activities and dispose of his time as he saw fit instead of working nine to five.

Despite Vulokh's complex artistic process and his reserved personality, which often showed a cool Scandinavian side, there were always people around who understood him and tried to hell. The sculptor Vyacheslav Klykov was utterly different from Igor: a strong man who is incredibly active yet also sensitive. Klykov organized a joint exhibition of their work in 1979 (something that was unthinkable at the time). A catalog with Vulokh's works remains from the show. After the exhibition, several of his works entered the collection of the Russian Museum in Saint Petersburg. At the certain moment, Vulokh understood that his and Klykov's views diverged significantly. A line was draw between the pair, and after have passed they parted ways.

White period 

In 1983, Igor met his future wife, the artists Natalya Tukolkina-Okhota, at the house of Vasily Grigoriev (the son of Renita and Yuri Grigoriev), which Igor had been frequenting for some time. She already “knew” Vulokh through his works. In the context of reality of times, they struck her with their novelty, originality, and powerful impact. This encounter opened a new world in art for the young man. In 1985, their daughter Lidia was born. With the appearance of family and stability, the White Period fully formed and began to occupy an ever-greater place in Vulokh's, as a sort of reflection of all the joyous events of his life that took place in those years.

In 1988, Troels Andersen published in Denmark the first monograph about Vulokh, whose art was still not officially recognized in Russia. The preface to the book contained Gennady Aigi's Twelve Parallels to Igor Vulokh. Vulokh´s works bring to mind such widely different artists as Morandi, Fautrier and de Staël - but they have above all, in spite of all the breaks and all isolation, come out of the Russian tradition. They live in the conflicts between abstraction and the experience of nature, the pictures are now signs, now vibrant expressions of a spiritual condition quote from the text by Troels Andersen.

Vanishing boundaries 

The Moscow Segodnya Gallery was one of the first to exhibit and advertise works of the “sixties artists”. It promoted Russian art abroad, and many works were regularly Russian art abroad, and many works were regularly sent to international art fairs. Igor Vulokh's solo exhibition at Segodnya Gallery was the first time that the broad Russian public could get acquainted with his work. The artworks were purchased by the Tretykov Gallery. In those years there was a lot of interest in Russian art in the West. In 1991, Vulokh went to West Berlin on the occasion of a solo exhibition of his work at the Brauner and PopovGallery. In 1993, Vulokh received a fellowship from Brandenburg and goes with his wife for a residential stay at Wiepersdorf Castle in Germany. This fellowship was awarded by the international community to eminent artists from different countries. This trip gave Igor a lot of experience in communicating with a broad international circle of literary and artistic cultural figures.

In 1994, Vulokh made a series of graphic illustrations for the poetry of the major contemporary Swedish poet Tomas Transtremer; this series was subsequently exhibited at the Transtremer Poetry Festival on the Isle of Gotland.

Igor Vulokh asked the Brandenburg administration to donate the paintings that he made in Wiepersdorf to the Danish Museum of Art, whose director is Troels Andersen. This led to the organization of Vulokh's solo exhibition and his trip to Denmark. Andrsen's museum had an enormous archive on history of international art. In addition to getting acquainted with very rare works on the history of art, Vulokh got artistic inspiration from this trip. The exhibition was successful, while his works acquired museum status in the West.

Deserved reward 

In 1996, the Ministry of Culture nominated Vulokh for the State Prize. In Soviet times, the Prize was awarded only to recognized masters of socialist realism. The gesture was a token of the long-awaited recognition of underground art by the state. Underground artists were nominated for this prize for the first time in Russian history.

A few years before, the Swiss banker and collector Urs Haener began to take an interest in Vulokh's work. Together with Swiss gallery owner Nadja Brykina, Haener made a trip to Vulokh's studio, examines his works, and asked about their origins. Haener, an exceptional individual, astounded Igor with his knowledge and understanding of contemporary art. His passionate enthralment and sincere desire to make Vulokh's works know to the world as quickly as possible were truly astonishing. For many years, Urs Haener collected Vulokh's works and give him assistance. At the same time, the Soros Foundation awarded Vulokh a grant in 2001 for the catalog of a successful exhibition at the Fine Art Gallery. A few years later, in 2006, Urs Haener orchestrates the publication of a wonderful book about Vulokh – the first and biggest monograph, in several languages simultaneously.

The publication of the monograph was followed by another solo exhibition of Vulokh's work, this time at the Nadja Brykina Gallery in Switzerland. Troels Andersen was invited as a special expert in charge of selecting works. He arranged them in groups and wrote a critical review for each group. The exhibition, held in Zuruch in 2006, was a success, receiving rave reviews from Western critics.

Today and always 

Igor Vulokh worked until his death. He died on the night of November 28, 2012 in hospital.

Today Vulokh's works are sold at all the leading international Auction houses, including Sotheby's and MacDougall's. After George Kostaki's Family transferred part of his collection to Thessaloniki, an exhibition was held in 2006, and a catalog was published with fifteen early works by the artist.

Exhibitions 

 Participated for the first time in the group exhibitions, Moscow, USSR, 1957
 Solo exhibition, Exhibition Room of the Moscow Branch of the USSR Union of Arts, Moscow, USSR, 1957
 Exhibition of Soviet Union Artists, New York, USA, 1981
 Exhibition of Soviet Union Artists, Bonn,Germany, 1982
 New International Art 1959–1984, Silkeborg, Denmark, 1984
 Inter 87 International Art Fair, Chicago, USA, 1987
 Inter Art 87 International Art Fair, Poznan, Poland, 1987
 Art 88 International Art Fair, Los Angeles, USA, 1988
 Art Sovetico 88, Helsinki, Finland, 1988
 Art Sovetico 88, Susma Suopelto, Finland
 Art Myth 1 International Art Fair, Central House of Artist, Moscow, USSR, 1990
 Solo Exhibition, Brauner and Popov Gallery. First trip abroad to West Berlin, 1991
 Artists to Malevich, State Tretyakov Gallery, Moscow, Russia, 1991
 Tokyo Art Expo International Art Exhibition Tokyo, Japan, 1991
 Art Myth 91, Moscow International Art Fair, Central Exhibition Hall, Moscow, Russia, 1991
 “Diaspora” Central House of the Artist, Moscow, Russia, 1992
 Solo Exhibition, Cristo Gallery, Vigevano, Italy, 1992
 Sels Gallery, Düsseldorf, Germany, 1993
 Second trip abroad, Wiepersdorf Cultural Center, Germany,1993
 “Postmodern” Tretykov State Gallery, 1993
 Fellowship from the Brandenburg Ministry of Culture, Germany. Three months of residency, followed by a group exhibition at Wiepersdorf Castle, 1993
 Solo Exhibition, Popov Gallery, Berlin, Germany, 1994–95
 Creation of a series of graphic illustrations for the poems of major contemporary Swedish poet T.Transtremer on the Isle of Gotland, Sweden, 1994
 Trip to Silkebord and Copenhagen, Denmark, 1995
 Exhibition, Fain Art Gallery, Moscow, Russia, 1997
 Five Graphic Series to the Poetry of Gennady Aigi and Tomas Transtremmer, Chuvash State Art Museum, Cheboksary, on the occasion of Vulokh's 60th birthday, 1998
 First solo exhibition in Russia at the National Cultural Center in Kazan, Russia, 1999
 Solo exhibition, Art Manege, Russian Galleries, Moscow, Russia, 2001
 Exhibition, Fain Art Gallery, Moscow, Russia, 2001
 Received a grant from the Soros Foundation for the publication of catalog of the exhibition at the Fain Art Gallery in Moscow, Russia, 2001
 Exhibition "Gestures of Fire" with the poet Gennady Aigi and the Embassy of Sweden. Timed to coincide with the 70th anniversary of the Swedish poet Tomas Transtremera, Fine Art Gallery, Moscow, Russia, 2001
 “Abstraction in Russia: 20th Century”, Russian Museum, Saint Petersburg, Russia, 2001–2002
 “Direction: West. Time Machine”, New Manege and Kino Gallery, Moscow, Russia, 2003
 “Black&White Cinema”, New Manege and Kino Gallery, Moscow, Russia, 2003
 “Direction: North, Direction: South”, New Manege and Kino Gallery, Moscow, Russia, 2004
 Art Manege 2005, Kino Gallery, Moscow, Russia, 2005
 Exhibition of early pictures in the State Museum of Conceptual Art, Thessaloniki, Greece, 2006
 Exhibition at the gallery Nadia Brykin, Zurich, Switzerland, 2006
 “Noncomformists on Red Square” Historical Museum and Connoisseur Gallery, Moscow, Russia, 2007
 Group exhibition of the collection of George Kostakis at the State Museum of Contemporary Art in Thessaloniki, Greece, 2007
 Group exhibition "Fifty-fifty": paintings and drawings Art from the collection of M. and M. Alshibaya Kurtser, Pushkin Museum, Moscow, Russia, 2007
 Exhibition at the gallery RuArts «Translation of Time», a private collection of Marianne Satarov and Yegor Altman, Moscow, Russia, 2008
 Exhibition dedicated to the 70th anniversary of Artists, private museum ART4.RU, Moscow, Russia, 2008
 Group exhibition in the MMSI "Traditions nonconformism," works from the collection of Joseph Badalov, Moscow, Russia, 2009
 Group exhibition, "To Export from the USSR." Works from the collection of Catherine and Vladimir Semenikhin, Cultural Foundation "Ekaterina", Moscow, Russia, 2011
 Group exhibition "informal meeting" at the State Russian Museum (Saint Petersburg), works from the collection of Hope Brykina (Nadja Brykina Gallery), Saint Petersburg, Russia, 2011
  Group exhibition "informal meeting" in Moscow gallery Hope Brykina, works from the collection of Hope Brykina (Nadja Brykina Gallery), Moscow, Russia, 2011
 Group exhibition, paintings from the collection of Michael and Kathy Alshibaya Falkovich, private museum ART4.RU, Moscow, Russia, 2012
 Solo exhibition "Return" in the gallery "Fine Art", Moscow, Russia, 2012
 Collective exhibition "Gray" in the gallery "Brusov Art Communication», Moscow, Russia, 2012
 Group exhibition "Porcelain Sixties" gallery "Romanov", Moscow, Russia, 2012

Museum collections 

 The State Tretyakov Gallery (Moscow)
 The State Russian Museum (Saint Petersburg)
 Museum of Modern Art (Silkeborg, Denmark)
 National Museum of Conceptual Art (Thessaloniki, Greece)
 Chuvash State Art Museum (Cheboksary)
 Museum of Contemporary Art ART4.RU (Moscow)
 Museum RSUH "Other Art". Collection of Eugene Nutovich (Moscow)

Private collections 

 Greece (Athens, G.Kostaki)
 United States (New York, F.Klauke)
Denmark (Copenhagen, J. Borg)
 France (Paris, L.Rabel, A.Vitez, M.Fonfred)
 Spain (Barcelona, C. Puig Dominique Serra)
 Italy (Rome, T.Guerro)
 Russia (Moscow, E. Altman, Kushner, M. Alshibay, M. Satarov, E. and W. Semenikhina Semenikhin, I. Markin, I. Badalov)
 Switzerland (Zurich, U.Hener).

Auctions 

 2012 - Geneshapiro, New York, USA
 2008 - Phillips de Pury & Company, London, UK
 2008 - MacDougall's, London, UK
 2008 - Sotheby's, London, UK
 2007 - Bruun Rasmussen, Copenhagen, Denmark
 2007 - MacDougall's, London, UK
 2007 - Sotheby's, London, UK
 2006 - MacDougall's, London, UK
 2006 - Sotheby's, London, UK
 1990 - New York, USA, "The Auction House of Habsburg-Feldman", "Contemporary Soviet Art"

References 

 Russuian Art Culture 
 ArtGuide 
 Mutual Art  
 ArtFacts 
 ArtInvestment 
 Art, Artists and Artworks news 
 Artsalon 
 "Lost a painter Igor Vulokh" TV channel "Culture"
 "He died Igor Vulokh" Lenta.ru 
 "He died Igor Vulokh" Kommersant-Online 
  "Porcelain Sixties" Art Magazine 
 Igor Vulokh Art4u 
 "Igor Vulokh" The Return " The Source for Nightlife & Culture 
 Igor Vulokh "The Return" Time Out "exhibition"  
 "Blades Vulokh multilayered, mnogoprostranstvenny, permeated the air and light" Kommersant FM 
 "informal meeting" unofficial artists Kommersant FM 
 Traditions of non-conformism TV channel "Culture", "exhibition" 
 "Igor Vulokh Exhibition opened in the capital" TV channel "Culture"
 Magazine TimeOut "Igor Vulokh taken to determine how non-conformist. But no reality does not match"
 "Igor Vulokh. Jubilee" Moscowout.ru 
 "Igor Vulokh - abstaktsionist, true to yourself" Moscowout.ru

20th-century Russian painters
Russian male painters
21st-century Russian painters
1938 births
2012 deaths
Burials in Troyekurovskoye Cemetery
20th-century Russian male artists
21st-century Russian male artists